The Antigua and Barbuda women's national football team, nicknamed The Benna Girls, is the national women's football team of Antigua and Barbuda and is overseen by the Antigua and Barbuda Football Association, a member of the CONCACAF and the Caribbean Football Union.

History

First Internationals (2004)
On 28 August 2004, after 34 years the Antigua and Barbuda Football Association became affiliated with the FIFA, Antigua and Barbuda women's football team had its first official match with Anguilla in Saint John. The game finished in favour of Antigua and Barbuda, with a 1–0 victory. The next day, they faced again and this time, the winning team was Anguilla.

Women's Caribbean Cup (2006)
The 2006 CONCACAF Women's Gold Cup qualification round was the first official competition in which Antigua and Barbuda participated in, also one of the qualifying stages was the second edition of the CFU Women's Caribbean Cup, who took place in Trinidad & Tobago. In the way, they faced Barbados in the first stage; the aggregate score between them was 1–0, product of an away victory and a goalless draw. The Benna Girls automatically advanced to the next stage.

In the First Round, the team was drawn in a Group (C) with Jamaica, St. Lucia and St. Kitts and Nevis. However, the results were negative, as they lost the three games they played. Antigua and Barbuda played all of its matches in Kingston, Jamaica. The three goalscorers for Antigua and Barbuda were Whitney Jacobs, Odeal Simon and Shennell Henry, with one goal each. The Benna Girls failed to qualify for the final tournament.

Unfavorable results at international competitions (2007–2010)

2008 Summer Olympics
During the 2008 Summer Olympics qualifiers, Antigua and Barbuda was sharing the group with Jamaica, Bermuda and Dominica. The only victory they had was in the first game, to Dominica by 3–0, and the first of two in 2007–2010. The Benna Girls achieved their worst defeat on the second match with Jamaica, a 12–0. The closing encounter with Bermuda had a 4–0 result, again from the rivals.

2010 Gold Cup qualifiers
Antigua and Barbuda opened the qualifying round for the 2010 CONCACAF Women's Gold Cup, who took place in Mexico, down by 2–1 against St. Lucia. The second game marked the second win during 2007–2010. The game was with the US Virgin Islands and counted with the goals of Lewis, Simon and Thomas. Both games were in home venue at Antigua Recreation Ground, St. John's, the country's capital city. Thanks to their only victory, they advanced to the Second Round.

The team was drawn in Group G during the Second Round. Antigua and Barbuda was beaten by the three teams who played with them, with a margin of more than three goals. The Benna Girls scored first goal of two in this round in a 4–1 loss with Haiti. The encounters with both Puerto Rico and Cuba finished in heavy defeats, with 8–0 and 6–1 respectively. All the games were played in Marabella, Trinidad and Tobago.

Women's Caribbean Cup (2014)
Antigua and Barbuda was registered on the qualification tournament of the 2014 CFU Women's Caribbean Cup, who also served as the qualifying tournament for both the 2014 CONCACAF Women's Championship and the 2015 FIFA Women's World Cup. Antigua & Barbuda and the other members of the group played the games on Antigua Recreation Ground in St. John's, the country's capital city. The Benna Girls won the three games, all of them with 1–0 versus U.S. Virgin Islands, St. Vincent & the Grenadines and Aruba. Antigua and Barbuda qualified for the final tournament in Trinidad and Tobago.

For the final tournament, the team was in Group B with the hosts Trinidad & Tobago, Martinique and St. Kitts & Nevis. It had a bad debut with Martinique in Hasely Crawford Stadium, Port of Spain, due to a 2–0 loss. The second game with the host country also finished on a defeat of a margin of three goals to zero. The team had their farewell with a 2–1 lost game against St. Kitts and Nevis. They finished the tournament with zero points and a –6 goal difference. The only goalscorer for the Benna Girls was Breanna Humphreys.

Team image

Kits and crest
The current kit of the Antigua and Barbuda national football team is made by Joma Sport. The team has three different colored uniforms. The yellow uniform is the primary one, normally used for home matches. The black ones are the usually for away matches. The team also has red as an alternate.

Kit suppliers

Results and fixtures

The following is a list of match results in the last 12 months, as well as any future matches that have been scheduled.

Legend

2022

Head-to-head record

Coaching staff

Current coaching staff

Head coach:  Prince Borde

Manager history

 Prince Borde (January 2022–current)

Players
Up-to-date caps, goals, and statistics are not publicly available; therefore, caps and goals listed may be incorrect.

Current squad
The following players were called-up for the match against Suriname on 12 April 2022.

Competitive record

FIFA Women's World Cup

*Draws include knockout matches decided on penalty kicks.

Olympic Games

*Draws include knockout matches decided on penalty kicks.

CONCACAF Women's Championship
{| class="wikitable" style="text-align: center"
|-
!colspan=9|CONCACAF W Championship record
!rowspan=14|
!colspan=8|Qualification record
|-
!Year
!Result
!GP
!W 
!D*
!L
!GF
!GA
!GD
!GP
!W 
!D*
!L
!GF
!GA
!GD
|- 
| 1991||colspan=8 rowspan=6|Did not exist
|colspan=7 rowspan=6|Did not exist
|-
| 1993
|-
| 1994
|-
| 1998
|- 
| 2000
|- 
| 2002
|-
| 2006||colspan=8 rowspan=5|Did not qualify
||5||1||1||3||4||16||-12
|- 
| 2010
||5||1||0||4||6||21||-15
|-
| 2014
|colspan=7|2014 Caribbean Cup
|-
| 2018
||7||3||0||4||5||26||-21
|-
| 2022
|colspan=7|In progress|-
!Total|| - || - || - || - || - || - || - || - 
!17||5||1||11||15||63||-48
|}*Draws include knockout matches decided on penalty kicks.CFU Women's Caribbean Cup*Draws include knockout matches decided on penalty kicks.''

See also
Sport in Antigua and Barbuda
Football in Antigua and Barbuda
Women's football in Antigua and Barbuda
Antigua and Barbuda men's national football team

References
 https://antiguaobserver.com/we-are-rather-confident-gomes-believes-us-based-borde-is-right-fit-for-senior-womens-team/amp/

External links
FIFA Team Profile
Official website